Guillermo Ignacio Nicolás "Willy" Dasso Drago (born 10 January 1917 in Lima, Peru; died 10 November 1990 in Lima, Peru) was a Peruvian basketball player who competed in the 1936 Summer Olympics. He was part of the Peruvian basketball team, which finished eighth in the Olympic tournament. He played both matches.

References

External links
 

1917 births
1990 deaths
Peruvian men's basketball players
Olympic basketball players of Peru
Basketball players at the 1936 Summer Olympics
Sportspeople from Lima
20th-century Peruvian people